Aranmula Ponnamma (8 April 1914 – 21 February 2011) was a National Award winning Indian actress known for her roles as mother of the protagonist in numerous films in a career spanning over five decades. She is widely described as a mother figure in Malayalam cinema. In 2005, she was honoured with the J. C. Daniel Award, Kerala government's highest honour for contributions to Malayalam cinema.

Early life
Ponnamma was born as one of five children of Malethu Kesava Pillai and Parukutty Amma in Aranmula, Pathanamthitta, Travancore. She has four siblings, Ramakrishna Pillai, Pankiyamma, Bhaskara Pillai and Thankamma. She started her career at the age of 12 as a Carnatic music vocalist. She began by singing before meetings organised by the Hindu Mahamandal on the banks of the Pampa river. At the age of 15, she was appointed as a music teacher in a primary school in Pala, before starting to teach in the senior classes. Later she joined the first batch of students at the Swati Tirunal Music Academy. After the course, she was appointed as the music teacher in Cotton Hill Girls' High School in Trivandrum.

Family
She was married to Late Kochu Krishna Pillai. The couple had a son, Late Rajashekharan and a daughter, Rajamma. Her granddaughter Radhika Suresh is married to Suresh Gopi.

Career
Ponnamma's acting debut happened at the age of 29, in a play titled Bhagyalakshmi. She went on to act in plays such as Prasanna, Chechi, Jeevithayathra and Rakthabandham, before debuting in films. Her debut role was that of the mother of the character played by Miss Kumari, a prominent actress at that time, in Sasidharan (1950). The same year she did another role as a mother in the Thikkurissy Sukumaran Nair starrer Amma, which was the first film of noted producer T. E. Vasudevan and also the 18th Malayalam film. In 1968, she acted in the film Viruthan Shanku directed by P. Venu, the first full-length comedy in Malayalam cinema. She was typecasted in mother roles. In her own words: "I did play a negative role in Paadunna Puzha and that of a wayward woman in Yachakan. But after that I was always cast as the mother. As the mother of two children, I was very comfortable in that role. My role model was my mother, Parukutty Amma, who had to look after her five children on her own after my father, Malethu Kesava Pillai, passed away when I was nine. In fact, in Amma, my fifth film, I was merely acting as my mother." In her career spanning over 60 years, she acted as the mother or grandmother of first generation actors like Thikkurissy Sukumaran Nair, second generation actors like Prem Nazir and Sathyan and third generation actors like Mammootty, Mohanlal and Suresh Gopi.

She appeared last in the film Gourisankaram (2004). She died on 21 February 2011, aged 96, at a private hospital in Thiruvananthapuram.

Awards

National Film Awards
 1996: Best Supporting Actress - Kathapurushan

Kerala State Film Awards
 2005: J. C. Daniel Award
 1996: Second Best Actress - Kathapurushan

Asianet Film Awards
 1998: Lifetime Achievement Award

Filmography

Television
Akashadoothu (Surya TV) - 2011
Kadamattathu Kathanar (Asianet) - 2004
Chuvappu Naada
Akshayapaathram
Mangalyasoothram

Dramas
 Bhagyalakshmi
 Rakthabandham
 Chechi
 Jeevithayathra
 Prasanna
 Randu Janmam

References

External links 
 
 Aranmula Ponnamma at MSI
 Malayalamcinema.com profile

1914 births
2011 deaths
J. C. Daniel Award winners
Kerala State Film Award winners
Best Supporting Actress National Film Award winners
Actresses in Malayalam cinema
Indian film actresses
Indian stage actresses
Actresses from Kerala
People from Aranmula
20th-century Indian actresses
21st-century Indian actresses
Indian women television presenters
Indian television presenters
Actresses in Malayalam television
Indian television actresses
Actresses in Tamil cinema
Women of the Kingdom of Travancore
People of the Kingdom of Travancore